Perchard is a surname. Notable people with the surname include:

Charles Perchard (born 1992), Jersey cricketer
Jim Perchard (born 1957), Jersey politician 
Peter Perchard (c. 1729–1806), British goldsmith and merchant
Tom Perchard (born 1976), British writer and musicologist